Indukuri Ramakrishnam Raju (31 August 1934 – 14 August 1994), populary known by his pen name Rajasri, was an Indian lyricist, screenwriter, film director, and music composer in Telugu cinema. He has worked on nearly 1000 films, a majority of them are dubbed films. He was popularly referred to as Anuvaada Brahma. He used to pen Telugu lyrics for most of the films dubbed from Tamil in the 1980s and early 1990s.

Early life
Rajasri was born as 'Indukuri Ramakrishnam Raju' to Indukuri Appalaraju and Narayanamma on 31 August 1934 in Vizianagaram. Right from early childhood he started writing stories and metrical poetry. He completed his B.Sc (Physics) from Maharajah's College in Vizianagaram. He learned typewriting. He worked as a typist-cum-personal-assistant in Srikakulam District Board.

Career 
Rajasri resigned his job and moved to Madras. He started assisting writer Pinisetty Sriramamurthy. The first film he worked for as a lyricist was Aada Pettanam (1954), produced by Kadaru Nagabhushanam and Kannamba. He also worked as an assistant director for Kadaru Nagabhusnam for the films like Aada Pettanam, Anna-Thammudu, Paruvu-Pratishta, Santha, Nithya Kalyanam Paccha Thoranam, Veera Bhaskarudu, and Sri Krishna Maaya.

Rajasri worked with L. V. Prasad in the story department of Prasad Productions for the films like Sasural (1961), Khilona (1970), Thayilla Pillai etc. He wrote lyrics for films like Rama Sundari. He worked with Chalam for some memorable films like Sambarala Rambabu (1970), Bullemma Bullodu, Devudamma, Thulaabhaaram (1974), Ramude Devudu, Ooriki Upakaari etc. He also wrote some memorable songs in these films.

Rajasri has worked with director Mani Ratnam for films like Mouna Ragam (1986), Naayakudu (1987), Gharshana (1988), Anjali (1990), Dalapathi (1991), Roja (1992), and Donga Donga (1993). Mani Ratnam got the dialogues written by Rajasri for his straight Telugu film Geethanjali (1989).

Rajasri has also composed music for a few films like Mama Kodalu (1993) and Venkanna Babu (1992) directed by Dasari Narayana Rao.

Death 
He died in his sleep while working for the film Premikudu on 14 August 1994, in Chennai.

His son Rajasri Sudhakar is also a dialogue writer and lyricist. Sudhakar has penned dialogues and songs for films like Krrish, Jodha Akbar, Krrish 3, Dhoom 2, Dangal, Dabangg 3 and Vikranth Rona that were dubbed into Telugu.

Discography

As lyricist for straight films

As lyricist for dubbed films

As music director

Filmography

As writer

As director

Awards
 He won Nandi Award for Second Best Story Writer for Bangaru Gaajulu (1968)

Notes

References

External links
 
 List of songs penned by Rajasri at Chimata Music.com

Telugu writers
Indian lyricists
1934 births
1994 deaths